Faustina Ampah (born November 30, 1996) is a Ghanaian defender currently playing for Belarus side, FC Minsk. Ampah is one of the two Ghanaians to have played in the round of 32 of UEFA Women's Champions League as at October 2017.

Club career
Ampah began her professional football career in Ghana, with Blessed Ladies and ended the 7 -year stay with the Kasoa based side by joining Czech Republic's Lokomotiva Brno Horní Heršpice on loan. Faustina Ampah was part of the FC Minsk team in the 2017-18 UEFA Women's Champions League, exiting the competition at the round of 32, losing to Slavia Prague and becoming the first Ghanaian to play in the round of 32 of the UEFA Women's Champions League.

International career
Faustina Ampah had her FIFA World Cup debut at the 2012 FIFA U-20 Women's World Cup hosted by Japan in 2012. Her debut game was against United States that ended 4:0 in favor of United States. Faustina Ampah was also part of the 2014 FIFA U-20 Women's World Cup and 2016 FIFA U-20 Women's World Cup making her the only Ghanaian to represent the nation at three FIFA U-20 Women's World Cup. 

Ampah's first competitive tournament for the Ghana women's national football team was the 2018 WAFU Women's Cup. She played in all five games of the tournament helping the Black Queens to the first place title. She scored a semifinal equalizer against Nigeria women's national football team She won the player of the match in that game.

Honours

club
FC Minsk
Belarusian Women's Super Cup 2017 Runner Up
Belarusian Premier League (women) 2017 Winners
Belarusian Women's Cup 2017 Winners
Belarusian Premier League (women) Super Cup 2018 -  Winners

National Team
Ghana Women's National Football Team
2018 WAFU Women's Cup Champions

References

 Faustina Ampah and Ernestina Abambila – Ghanaians in UWCL R32 173

External links
 
 
 spicefmonline.com

Living people
1996 births
Ghanaian women's footballers
Ghanaian expatriate footballers
FC Minsk (women) players
Women's association football defenders
Ghana women's international footballers
Expatriate women's footballers in the Czech Republic
Ghanaian expatriate sportspeople in the Czech Republic
Expatriate women's footballers in Belarus
Ghanaian expatriate sportspeople in Belarus
Ghanaian expatriate women's footballers